Dire Straits were a British rock band formed in London in 1977 by Mark Knopfler (lead vocals and lead guitar), David Knopfler (rhythm guitar and backing vocals), John Illsley (bass guitar and backing vocals) and Pick Withers (drums and percussion). They were active from 1977 to 1988 and again from 1990 to 1995.

Their first single, "Sultans of Swing", from their 1978 self-titled debut album, reached the top ten in the UK and US charts. It was followed by hit singles including "Romeo and Juliet" (1981), "Private Investigations" (1982), "Twisting by the Pool" (1983), "Money for Nothing" (1985), and "Walk of Life" (1985). Their most commercially successful album, Brothers in Arms (1985), has sold more than 30 million copies; it was the first album to sell a million copies on compact disc and is the eighth-bestselling album in UK history.  According to the Guinness Book of British Hit Albums, Dire Straits have spent over 1,100 weeks on the UK albums chart, the fifth most of all time.

Dire Straits' sound draws from various influences, including country, folk, the blues rock of J. J. Cale, and jazz. Their stripped-down sound contrasted with punk rock and demonstrated a roots rock influence that emerged from pub rock. There were several changes in personnel, with Mark Knopfler and Illsley being the only members who lasted from the beginning of the band's existence to the end. After their first breakup in 1988, Knopfler told Rolling Stone: "A lot of press reports were saying we were the biggest band in the world. There's not an accent then on the music, there's an accent on popularity. I needed a rest." They disbanded for good in 1995, after which Knopfler launched a solo career full-time. He has since declined numerous reunion offers.

Dire Straits were called "the biggest British rock band of the 80s" by Classic Rock magazine; their 1985–1986 world tour, which included a performance at Live Aid in July 1985, set a record in Australasia. Their final world tour from 1991 to 1992 sold 7.1 million tickets. Dire Straits won four Grammy Awards, three Brit Awards (Best British Group twice), two MTV Video Music Awards, and various other awards. They were inducted into the Rock and Roll Hall of Fame in 2018. Dire Straits have sold between 100 and 120 million units worldwide, including 51.4 million certified units, making them one of the best-selling music artists.

History

1977–1979: Early years and first two albums

Brothers Mark and David Knopfler, from Newcastle in the northeast of England, and friends John Illsley and Pick Withers, from Leicester in the East Midlands, formed Dire Straits in London in 1977. Withers was already a 10-year music business veteran, having been a session drummer for Dave Edmunds, Gerry Rafferty, Magna Carta and others through the 1970s; he was part of the group Spring, which recorded an album for RCA in 1971. At the time of the band's formation, Mark was working as an English teacher, Illsley was studying at Goldsmiths' College, and David was a social worker. Mark and Withers had both been part of the pub rock group Brewers Droop at different points in and around 1973.

The band was initially known as the Café Racers. The name Dire Straits was coined by a musician flatmate of Withers, allegedly thought up while they were rehearsing in the kitchen of a friend, Simon Cowe, of Lindisfarne.  In 1977, the group recorded a five-song demo tape which included their future hit single, "Sultans of Swing", as well as "Water of Love" and "Down to the Waterline". After a performance at the Rock Garden in 1977, they took a demo tape to MCA in Soho but were turned down. They then went to DJ Charlie Gillett, presenter of Honky Tonk on BBC Radio London. The band simply wanted advice, but Gillett liked the music so much that he played "Sultans of Swing" on his show. Two months later, Dire Straits signed a recording contract with the Vertigo division of Phonogram Inc. In October 1977, the band recorded demo tapes of "Southbound Again", "In the Gallery" and "Six Blade Knife" for BBC Radio London; in November, demo tapes were made of "Setting Me Up", "Eastbound Train" and "Real Girl".

The group's first album, Dire Straits, was recorded at Basing Street studios in Notting Hill, London in February 1978, at a cost of £12,500. Produced by Muff Winwood, it was first released in the United Kingdom on Vertigo Records, then a division of Phonogram Inc. It came to the attention of A&R representative Karin Berg, working at Warner Bros. Records in New York City. She felt that it was the kind of music audiences were hungry for, but only one person in her department agreed at first. Many of the songs on the album reflected Mark Knopfler's experiences in Newcastle, Leeds and London. "Down to the Waterline" recalled images of life in Newcastle; "In the Gallery" is a tribute to Leeds sculptor/artist Harry Phillips (father of Steve Phillips); "Wild West End" and "Lions" were drawn from Knopfler's early days in the capital.

That year, Dire Straits began a tour as opening band for Talking Heads, after the re-released "Sultans of Swing" finally started to climb the UK charts. This led to a United States recording contract with Warner Bros. Records; before the end of 1978, Dire Straits had released their self-titled debut worldwide. They received more attention in the US, but also arrived at the top of the charts in Canada, Australia and New Zealand. Dire Straits eventually went top 10 in every European country.

The following year, Dire Straits embarked on their first North American tour. They played 51 sold-out concerts over a 38-day period. "Sultans of Swing" scaled the charts to No. 4 in the United States and No. 8 in the United Kingdom. The song was one of Dire Straits' biggest hits and became a fixture in the band's live performances. Bob Dylan, who had seen the band play in Los Angeles, was so impressed that he invited Mark Knopfler and drummer Pick Withers to play on his next album, Slow Train Coming.

Recording sessions for the group's second album, Communiqué, took place in December 1978 at Compass Point Studios in Nassau, Bahamas. Released in June 1979, Communiqué was produced by Jerry Wexler and Barry Beckett and went to No. 1 on the German album charts, with the debut album Dire Straits simultaneously at No. 3. In the United Kingdom, the album peaked at No. 5 in the album charts. Featuring the single "Lady Writer", the second album continued in a similar vein to the first and displayed the expanding scope of Knopfler's lyricism on the opening track, "Once Upon a Time in the West". In the coming year, however, this approach began to change, along with the group's line-up.

1980–1984: Increased musical complexity and early success

In 1980, Dire Straits were nominated for two Grammy Awards for Best New Artist and Best Rock Vocal Performance by a Duo or Group for "Sultans of Swing". In July 1980, the band started recording tracks for their third album. Produced by Jimmy Iovine, with Mark Knopfler also sharing credit, Making Movies was released in October 1980. During the recording sessions, tension between Mark and David Knopfler took its toll on the band, and David Knopfler left over creative differences with his brother to pursue a solo career; he was uncredited on the album. The sessions continued with Sid McGinnis on rhythm guitar and keyboardist Roy Bittan from Bruce Springsteen's E Street Band. After the recording sessions were completed, keyboardist Alan Clark and Californian guitarist Hal Lindes joined Dire Straits as full-time members for tours of Europe, North America, and Oceania.
 
Making Movies received mostly positive reviews and featured longer songs with more complex arrangements, a style which would continue for the rest of the band's career. The album featured many of Mark Knopfler's most personal compositions. The most successful chart single was "Romeo and Juliet" (number 8 in the UK Singles Chart), a song about a failed love affair, with Knopfler's trademark in keeping personal songs under fictitious names. Although never released as a hit single, "Solid Rock" was featured in all Dire Straits' live shows from this point on for the remainder of their career, while the album's lengthy opening track, "Tunnel of Love", with its intro "The Carousel Waltz" by Richard Rodgers and Oscar Hammerstein II, was featured in the 1982 Richard Gere film An Officer and a Gentleman. Although "Tunnel of Love" only reached the position of No. 54 in the UK when released as a single in 1981, it remains one of Dire Straits' most famous and popular songs and immediately became a favourite at concerts. Making Movies stayed in the UK Albums Chart for five years, peaking at No. 4. Rolling Stone ranked Making Movies number 52 on its list of the "100 Best Albums of the Eighties".

Dire Straits' fourth studio album Love Over Gold, an album of songs filled with lengthy passages that featured Alan Clark's piano and keyboard work, was well received when it was released in September 1982, going gold in America and spending four weeks at number one in the United Kingdom. The title was inspired by graffiti seen from the window of Knopfler's old council flat in London. The phrase was taken from the sleeve of an album by Captain Beefheart. Love Over Gold was the first Dire Straits album produced solely by Mark Knopfler, and its main chart hit, "Private Investigations", gave Dire Straits their first top 5 hit single in the United Kingdom, where it reached the number 2 position, despite its almost seven-minute length, and became another of the band's most popular live songs.

In other parts of the world, "Industrial Disease", a song that looks at the decline of the British manufacturing industry in the early 1980s, focusing on strikes, depression and dysfunctionality, was the main single from the album, particularly in Canada, where it became a top 10 hit. As well as the title track and "It Never Rains", Love Over Gold featured the 14-minute-long epic "Telegraph Road". Also written by Knopfler during this period was "Private Dancer", which did not appear on the album, but was eventually given to Tina Turner for her comeback album of the same name. Love Over Gold reportedly sold two million copies during the first six weeks after its release. Shortly after the release of Love Over Gold, drummer Pick Withers left the band. His replacement was Terry Williams, formerly of Rockpile and a range of other Welsh bands, including Man.

In January 1983, a four-song EP titled ExtendedancEPlay was released while Love Over Gold was still in the album charts. It featured the hit single "Twisting By the Pool", which reached the Top 20 in the UK and Canada. The band won Best British Group at the 1983 Brit Awards. With session keyboard player Tommy Mandel added to the live line-up to help Clark cover his increasingly detailed keyboard parts and arrangements, Dire Straits embarked on an eight month long Love over Gold Tour, which finished with two concerts at London's Hammersmith Odeon on 22 and 23 July 1983. The double album Alchemy Live was a recording of excerpts from these two concerts and was reportedly released without studio overdubs. It was released in March 1984, reaching the Top 3 in the UK Albums Chart.

During 1983 and 1984, Mark Knopfler was also involved in other projects outside of the band. He wrote the music scores for the films Local Hero, which extensively featured Alan Clark's keyboards, and Cal, which were also released as albums. The final track of Local Hero, "Going Home (Theme Of The Local Hero)", is played before every home game of Newcastle United, Knopfler's local team. Also, during this time Knopfler produced Bob Dylan's Infidels which also featured Straits' member Alan Clark, as well as Aztec Camera and Willy DeVille. Also in 1984, John Illsley released his first solo album, Never Told a Soul, to which Mark Knopfler, Alan Clark and Terry Williams contributed.

1985–1986: The Brothers in Arms era and international success
Dire Straits returned to recording at the end of 1984 and began recording tracks at Air Studios in Montserrat for their upcoming fifth studio album, to be titled Brothers in Arms, with Mark Knopfler and Neil Dorfsman producing. The recording sessions saw further personnel changes.  Mandel had returned to session work and the band added a full-time second keyboardist, Guy Fletcher, who had previously worked as a session musician with Roxy Music and on the Cal soundtrack. Guitarist Hal Lindes left the band during the recording sessions and was replaced by New York guitarist Jack Sonni.

According to a Sound on Sound magazine interview with Neil Dorfsman, the style of then-permanent drummer Terry Williams was considered to be unsuitable for the desired sound of the album during the first month of the recording sessions. Williams was released from the recording sessions and temporarily replaced by jazz session drummer Omar Hakim, who re-recorded the album's drum parts before leaving for other commitments. Both Hakim and Williams are credited on the album, although Williams' single contribution was the improvised cadenza at the beginning of "Money for Nothing". The remainder of the album features Hakim on drums. Williams would be back in the band for the music videos and the 1985–1986 Brothers in Arms world tour that followed.

Released in May 1985, Brothers in Arms entered the UK Albums Chart at number 1 and spent a total of 228 weeks in the charts and sold over 4.3 million copies. It went on to become the best-selling album of 1985 in the UK. Brothers in Arms was similarly successful in the US, peaking at No. 1 on Billboard 200 for nine weeks, going multi-platinum and selling nine million copies there. The album spent 34 weeks at number 1 on the Australian ARIA Charts, and it remains the longest-running number one album in Australia.

The album featured a more lavish production and overall sound than Dire Straits' earlier work and spawned several big chart singles: "Money for Nothing", which reached number 1 on the US Billboard Hot 100, and number 4 in the UK Singles Chart, "So Far Away" (No. 20 UK, No. 19 US), "Brothers in Arms" (No. 16 UK), "Walk of Life" (No. 2 UK, No. 7 US), and "Your Latest Trick" (No. 26 UK). "Money for Nothing" was the first video to be played on MTV in the UK and featured guest vocals by Sting, who is credited with co-writing the song with Mark Knopfler, although it was the inclusion of the melody from "Don't Stand So Close To Me" that triggered the copyright credit, as no actual lyrics were written by Sting. It also won a Grammy Award for Best Rock Performance by a Duo or Group with Vocal in February 1986.

Brothers in Arms was the first album recorded entirely digitally, because of Knopfler pushing for improved sound quality. Written during Britain's involvement in the Falklands War of 1982, the album's title track, "Brothers in Arms", deals with the senselessness of war. In 2007, the 25th anniversary of the war, Knopfler recorded a new version of the song at Abbey Road Studios to raise funds for British veterans who he said "are still suffering from the effects of that conflict." "Brothers in Arms" has become a favourite at military funerals. Reported to be the world's first CD single, it was issued in the UK as a promotional item distinguished with a logo for the tour, Live in '85, while a second to commemorate the Australian leg of the tour marked Live in '86. "Walk of Life" meanwhile was nearly excluded from the album when co-producer Neil Dorfsman voted against its inclusion, but the band members out-voted him. The result was Dire Straits' most commercially successful hit single in the UK, peaking at number two.

The album is listed in the Guinness Book of World Records as the first compact disc (CD) to sell a million copies, and it has been credited with popularising the CD format. The Guardian ranked the Brothers in Arms CD number 38 in their list of the 50 key events in rock music history. The album featured the full version of the "Money for Nothing" cut, rather than the LP version, and it also includes extended versions of all tracks on the first side of the LP, with the exception of "Walk of Life".

The 1985–1986 Brothers in Arms world tour which followed the album's release was phenomenally successful, with over 2.5 million tickets sold. The tour included dates in Europe, Israel, North America, and Australia and New Zealand. The band played 248 shows in over 100 different cities. Saxophonist Chris White joined the band, and the tour began on 25 April 1985 in Split, Croatia (then part of Yugoslavia). While playing a 13-night residency at Wembley Arena in London, the band moved down the road to Wembley Stadium on the afternoon of 13 July 1985, to appear in a Live Aid slot, in which their set included "Money For Nothing" with Sting as guest vocalist. John Illsley states, “It was a very special feeling to be part of something so unique. Live Aid was a unique privilege for all of us. It’s become a fabulous memory.” The tour ended at the Sydney Entertainment Centre, Australia, on 26 April 1986, where Dire Straits still holds the record for consecutive appearances at 21 nights. The band also made an impromptu attempt at the Australian folk song "Waltzing Matilda". With 900,000 tickets sold in Australia and New Zealand, it was the biggest concert tour in Australasian music history, until it was overtaken in 2017–2018 by Ed Sheeran.

Additionally in 1985, a group that set out from London to Khartoum to raise money for famine relief, led by John Abbey, was called "The Walk of Life". Dire Straits donated the Brothers in Arms Gold disc to the participants in recognition of what they were doing. The band's concert of 10 July 1985 at Wembley Arena, in which they were accompanied by Nils Lofgren for "Solid Rock" and Hank Marvin joined the band at the end to play "Going Home" (the theme from Local Hero), was televised in the United Kingdom on The Tube on Channel 4 in January 1986. (Although never officially released, bootleg recordings of the performance entitled Wembley does the Walk (2005) have been circulated.)

In 1986, Brothers in Arms won two Grammy Awards and also won Best British Album at the 1987 Brit Awards. Q magazine placed the album at number 51 in its list of the 100 Greatest British Albums Ever in 2000. The album also ranked number 351 on Rolling Stone magazine's list of the "500 Greatest Albums of All Time" in 2003. Brothers in Arms is also ranked number 3 in the best albums of 1985 and number 31 in the best albums of the 1980s, and as of December 2017, the album was ranked the eighth-best-selling album in UK chart history, and is the 107th-best-selling album in the United States. In August 1986, MTV Europe was launched with Dire Straits' "Money for Nothing".

1987–1990: First break-up
After the Brothers in Arms tour ended, Mark Knopfler took a break from Dire Straits, and, during 1987, he concentrated on solo projects and film soundtracks. Dire Straits regrouped in 1988 for the Nelson Mandela 70th Birthday Tribute concert, staged on 11 June 1988 at Wembley Stadium, in which they were the headline act. They were joined for their set by Eric Clapton, who performed his hit "Wonderful Tonight" with the group and played rhythm guitar on the other songs performed by the band, while guitarist Jack Sonni was absent. Soon afterwards, Williams and Sonni left the band.

Mark Knopfler announced the dissolution of Dire Straits in September 1988. He told Rob Tannenbaum in Rolling Stone: "A lot of press reports were saying we were the biggest band in the world. There's not an accent then on the music, there's an accent on popularity. I needed a rest." The tremendous success of the Brothers in Arms album and the tour that went with it left the band members under a significant amount of stress, and Knopfler announced that he wanted to work on more personal projects. A best of / greatest hits compilation Money for Nothing, was released in October 1988 and reached number one in the UK. The group's first hit single "Sultans of Swing" was re-released as a single in the UK to promote the album. Also in 1988, John Illsley released his second solo album, Glass, which featured Mark Knopfler, Alan Clark, Guy Fletcher and Chris White. During this period, Alan Clark joined Eric Clapton's band for three years, during which time Knopfler also briefly joined Eric's band.

In 1989, over a meal at a Notting Hill wine bar, Knopfler formed The Notting Hillbillies, a country-focused band whose line-up featured Guy Fletcher, Brendan Croker, and Steve Phillips, and manager Ed Bicknell on drums. The Notting Hillbillies' one album, Missing...Presumed Having a Good Time, with its minor hit single "Your Own Sweet Way", was released in 1990. The Notting Hillbillies toured for the remainder of the year and also appeared on Saturday Night Live. Knopfler would further emphasise his country music influences on his 1990 collaboration with guitarist Chet Atkins, Neck and Neck.

In 1990, Dire Straits performed alongside Elton John and Eric Clapton at Knebworth Festival, playing "Solid Rock", "Money for Nothing" and "I Think I Love You Too Much". Knopfler explained that the latter was an experimental song and was unsure if they should record it on a following record. The song, a blues rock track with solos by Knopfler and Clapton, also appeared on the 1990 album Hell To Pay as a gift to Canadian blues/jazz artist Jeff Healey from Knopfler. This was prior to the time that Knopfler, Illsley and manager Ed Bicknell decided to reform the band the following year.

1991–1995: Resurrection, final albums and final dissolution
In early 1991, Dire Straits reunited. Retaining Bicknell as their manager, Dire Straits comprised only four members once again: Clark, Fletcher, Illsley and Knopfler. The band began recording a new album, produced by Knopfler, Clark and Fletcher, integrating new session musicians, including steel guitarist Paul Franklin and percussionist Danny Cummings. Saxophonist Chris White returned, and guitarist Phil Palmer filled the vacancy left by Sonni. The new album also included Toto drummer Jeff Porcaro, and session drummer Chris Whitten joined the band for the subsequent world tour.

Dire Straits released their sixth studio album, On Every Street, in September 1991, which turned out to be their final studio release. It was met with more moderate success and mixed reviews, as well as a significantly reduced audience. Some retrospective reviewers, including the All Music Guide, dubbed On Every Street an "underwhelming" follow-up to Brothers in Arms. However, it had sold 15 million copies by 2008, and on release it went straight to number 1 in the UK Albums Chart. The album also reached number 1 in numerous European countries and Australia and was particularly successful in France, where it achieved Diamond certification. In the United States it peaked at number 12.

The album was produced by Mark Knopfler, Alan Clark, and Guy Fletcher. Several singles were released from the album, some of which achieved success in Europe, Australasia and the United States; however, none were successful in the UK. An edited version of the opening track "Calling Elvis" was the first single released from the album. With a video based on the 1960s television show Thunderbirds, the track charted at number 21 on its first week in the UK Singles Chart but dropped out of the charts within four weeks. The track fared much better elsewhere however, reaching the top 10 in Australia, New Zealand and throughout Europe, peaking as high as the number 2 position in several countries, including Denmark and Switzerland, and number 1 in Italy.

The follow-up single, "Heavy Fuel", failed to reach the Top 50 in the UK Singles chart; however, it reached number one in the United States on the Billboard Mainstream Rock Tracks chart, their second song to do so (after "Money for Nothing"). The track reached the top 20 in Canada and Belgium and peaked inside top 30 in other European countries, as well as Australia. The album's title track was also relatively unsuccessful in the UK, failing to reach the top 40, although it reached the top 25 in France. The final single released from the album and from the band in the UK was "The Bug", which contains backing vocals by Vince Gill, who was invited to join the band full-time but declined and pursued a solo career.

With Chris Whitten added to the lineup, Dire Straits embarked on a world tour to promote the album, which lasted until October 1992. The On Every Street Tour featured 300 shows in front of some 7.1 million ticket-buying fans. While musically more elaborate than the previous 1985–86 world tour, the band's gruelling final tour was not as critically acclaimed nor as successful commercially. This proved to be too much for Dire Straits, and by this time Mark Knopfler had had enough of such massive operations. This led to the second and final break-up. Bill Flanagan described the sequence of events in GQ: "The subsequent world tour lasted nearly two years, made mountains of money and drove Dire Straits into the ground. When the tour was over, both Knopfler's marriage and his band were gone."

Manager Ed Bicknell also said, "The last tour was utter misery. Whatever the zeitgeist was that we had been part of, it had passed." John Illsley agreed, saying "Personal relationships (marriages) were in trouble and it put a terrible strain on everybody, emotionally and physically. We were changed by it." The last stop and final touring concert of the group took place on 9 October 1992 in Zaragoza, Spain.

After the end of the tour, Mark Knopfler expressed a wish to give up touring on a big scale and took some time out from the music business. A live album, On the Night, was released in May 1993, which documented the tour, again to very mixed reviews. Nevertheless, it reached the UK Top 5, a rare achievement for a live album. The four track Encores EP was also released and rose to number one in the French and Spanish singles charts and reached number 31 in the UK.

Dire Straits' final album, Live at the BBC, is a collection of live recordings from 1978 to 1981, which mostly feature the original line-up of the band. Released in June 1995, their third and final live album was a contractual release to Vertigo Records (now a division of Mercury Records). At this time, Mark Knopfler quietly disbanded Dire Straits and prepared to work on his first full-fledged solo album (still signed to Mercury Records). Knopfler later recalled that, "I put the thing to bed because I wanted to get back to some kind of reality. It's self-protection, a survival thing. That kind of scale is dehumanizing." Knopfler spent two years recovering from the experience, which had taken a toll on his creative and personal life.

1996–present: Rock and Roll Hall of Fame induction
After disbanding Dire Straits, Mark Knopfler started his career as a solo artist, releasing his first solo album, Golden Heart, in March 1996 after nearly 20 years of collaborations. Brothers in Arms was certified nine times platinum in the US in August 1996. During that year, the entire Dire Straits catalogue was remastered by Bob Ludwig and re-released on CD on Mercury Records, in most of the world outside the United States. The remasters were released in September 2000 in the United States, on Warner Bros.

Knopfler, John Illsley, Alan Clark, and Guy Fletcher reunited for one last time on 19 June 1999, with Ed Bicknell on drums, playing five songs, including a performance of Chuck Berry's "Nadine" for Illsley's wedding.  In 2002, Mark Knopfler was joined by John Illsley, Guy Fletcher, Danny Cummings and Chris White for four charity concerts. Brendan Croker joined Knopfler during the first half, playing mainly material composed with The Notting Hillbillies. Illsley came on for a Dire Straits session, toward the end of which, at a Shepherd's Bush concert, Jimmy Nail came on to provide backing vocals for Knopfler's solo composition, "Why Aye Man". The song appears in the 2002 album The Ragpicker's Dream, an album that contains numerous other references to Knopfler's home area in North East England.

The most recent compilation, The Best of Dire Straits & Mark Knopfler: Private Investigations, was released in November 2005 and reached the UK Top 20. Featuring material from the majority of Dire Straits' studio albums as well as Mark Knopfler's solo and soundtrack material, it was released in two editions, a single CD with grey cover and a double CD in blue cover. The only previously unreleased track on the album, "All the Roadrunning", is a duet with singer Emmylou Harris. The album was well received. Also in 2005, Brothers in Arms was re-released in a limited 20th anniversary edition, which was a success, winning a Grammy Award for Best Surround Sound Album at the 48th Grammy Awards ceremony.

Since the break-up of Dire Straits, Mark Knopfler has shown no interest in re-forming the band and is quoted as saying "Oh, I don't know whether to start getting all that stuff back together again," and telling reporters that "I would only do that for a charity. I'm glad I've experienced it all – I had a lot of fun with it – but I like things the way they are." However, keyboardist Guy Fletcher has been associated with almost every piece of Knopfler's solo material to date, and Danny Cummings has frequently contributed, notably to three of Knopfler's most recent solo album releases: All the Roadrunning (with Emmylou Harris), Kill to Get Crimson and Get Lucky.

In 2007, Knopfler said he did not miss the global fame that came his way at the height of the band's success, explaining that "It just got too big."  In October 2008, John Illsley told the BBC that he wanted Knopfler to agree to re-form Dire Straits for a comeback tour. Knopfler declined, saying that he was often reluctant to re-form the group and insisted that he "isn't even a fan of Dire Straits' early hits." In the same interview, Illsley also suggested that Knopfler is enjoying his continued success as a solo artist, saying that "He's doing incredibly well as a solo artist, so hats off to him. He's having a perfectly good time doing what he's doing." Guy Fletcher stated on his website that Knopfler has no interest in re-forming Dire Straits.

In December 2009, the band were commemorated with a Heritage Award from PRS for Music. A plaque was placed on a block of flats in Deptford, London, the location where Dire Straits played their first gig. In 2011, Alan Clark, Chris White, and Phil Palmer, along with Tom Petty and the Heartbreakers' drummer Steve Ferrone, formed a new band, the Straits, to perform at a charity show at the Royal Albert Hall in London. On 13 December 2017, Dire Straits were announced as inductees into the Rock and Roll Hall of Fame for 2018. Speaking to Billboard magazine, John Illsley stated, "It fills me with a lot of pleasure to be recognized and to be included in the thing that we love doing best, which is making music and playing rock n' roll." On a possible reunion performance, he added, "Mark is quite sort of restrained about things like this. We have spoken about [the induction], and he just said, 'Oh, that's nice.' I think it would probably be important if Mark and I were there. I'll definitely be there, and I'll definitely talk Mark into coming as well. It's essentially up to him if he wants to do anything, and I completely respect his feelings about it. He doesn't want too much white light."  Knopfler did not appear at the ceremony, with Illsley stating, "I'll assure you it's a personal thing. Let's just leave it at that." The Rock and Roll Hall of Fame recognised John Illsley, David & Mark Knopfler, Pick Withers, Alan Clark and Guy Fletcher as "significant members" of the band. Only Clark, Fletcher and Illsley turned up for the ceremony.

In 2009, Illsley and Clark performed several Dire Straits songs in an open air concert in San Vigilio, and since then Clark, Palmer, Illsley, Cummings, Collins, Sonni and Withers, in various line-ups, have toured as the Dire Straits Legends and continue to this day as the Dire Straits Legacy. They also released an album 3 Chord Trick. In a 2018 US tour, they were joined by multi award-winning producer and bass player Trevor Horn of The Buggles and drummer Steve Ferrone.

In September 2021, Alan Clark released his piano solo album Backstory, while in November 2021 John Illsley published his autobiography My Life in Dire Straits. Dire Straits remains one of the most popular British rock bands as well as one of the world's most commercially successful artists, with total worldwide album sales of more than 120 million.

Band members

 Mark Knopfler: lead vocals, lead & rhythm guitar (1977–1995)
 John Illsley: bass, backing vocals (1977–1995)
 Pick Withers: drums, occasional backing vocals (1977–1982)
 David Knopfler: rhythm guitar, backing vocals (1977–1980)
 Alan Clark: keyboards (1980–1995)
 Hal Lindes: rhythm guitar, backing vocals (1980–1984)
 Terry Williams: drums (1982–1988)
 Guy Fletcher: keyboards, backing vocals (1984–1995)
 Jack Sonni: rhythm guitar, backing vocals (1984–1988)

Discography

Studio albums
 Dire Straits (1978)
 Communiqué (1979)
 Making Movies (1980)
 Love over Gold (1982)
 Brothers in Arms (1985)
 On Every Street (1991)

Awards

Honoured and inducted
 PRS for Music Heritage Award 2009
 Rock and Roll Hall of Fame 2018

Won
 Brit Awards 1983 – British Group
 Brit Awards 1986 – British Group
 Grammy Award 1986 – Best Rock Performance by a Duo Or Group (for "Money for Nothing")
 Grammy Award 1986 – Brothers in Arms Best Engineered Recording, Non-Classical (for Brothers in Arms, Mark Knopfler Neil Dorfsman engineer)
 Juno Award 1986 – International Album of the Year
 MTV Video Music Award 1986 – Video of the Year (for "Money for Nothing")
 MTV Video Music Award 1986 – Best Group Video (for "Money for Nothing")
 Brit Awards 1987 – British Album of the Year (for Brothers in Arms)
 Grammy Award 1987 – Best Music Video (for "Brothers in Arms")
 Grammy Award 2006 – Best Surround Sound Album (for his surround sound production for Brothers in Arms—20th Anniversary Edition, Chuck Ainlay, surround mix engineer; Bob Ludwig, surround mastering engineer; Chuck Ainlay and Mark Knopfler, surround producers)

Nominated
 Grammy Award 1980 – Best New Artist
 Grammy Award 1980 – Best Rock Vocal Performance by a Duo or Group (for "Sultans of Swing")
 American Music Award 1986 – Favorite Pop/Rock Single (for "Money for Nothing")
 Brit Awards 1986 – British Album of the Year (for Brothers in Arms)
 Brit Awards 1986 – British Single (for "Money for Nothing")
 Brit Awards 1986 – British Video (for "Money for Nothing")
 Grammy Award 1986 – Album of the Year (for Brothers in Arms)
 Grammy Award 1986 – Record of the Year (for "Money for Nothing")
 Grammy Award 1986 – Song of the Year (for "Money for Nothing")
 MTV Video Music Award 1986 – Best Concept Video (for "Money for Nothing")
 MTV Video Music Award 1986 – Most Experimental Video (for "Money for Nothing")
 MTV Video Music Award 1986 – Best Stage Performance in a Video (for "Money for Nothing")
 MTV Video Music Award 1986 – Best Overall Performance in a Video (for "Money for Nothing")
 MTV Video Music Award 1986 – Best Direction in a Video (for "Money for Nothing")
 MTV Video Music Award 1986 – Best Visual Effects in a Video (for "Money for Nothing")
 MTV Video Music Award 1986 – Best Art Direction in a Video (for "Money for Nothing")
 MTV Video Music Award 1986 – Best Editing in a Video (for "Money for Nothing")
 MTV Video Music Award 1986 – Viewer's Choice (for "Money for Nothing")
 Brit Awards 1987 – British Group
 Brit Awards 1992 – British Group
 Grammy Award 1992 – Best Music Video (for "Calling Elvis")
 Brit Awards 2010 – British Album of Thirty Years (for Brothers in Arms)

See also 
 "Between dire straits": The Three Weeks

References

Further reading

External links

 
 Dire Straits' demo tape (1977)

 
1977 establishments in England
APRA Award winners
Brit Award winners
English blues rock musical groups
Grammy Award winners
Juno Award for International Album of the Year winners
Musical groups established in 1977
Musical groups disestablished in 1995
Musical groups from London
Roots rock music groups
Second British Invasion artists
Vertigo Records artists
Warner Records artists
Musical groups from the London Borough of Lewisham